Jurre van Aken (born 23 February 2003) is a Dutch footballer who plays for Jong AZ in the Eerste Divisie.

Career
Van Aken joined the academy at AZ Alkmaar in 2014 from amateur side Victoria Obdam. By following the route from Victoria Ondam to AZ van Aken was hoping to follow in the footsteps of former Cameroon international Willie Overtoom who also took that pathway. He signed a pro contract with AZ in June 2021 up to the summer of 2023, with the option of an extra season. He made his debut in the Eerste Divisie on 15 April 2022 against ADO Den Haag appearing as a substitute in a 1-0 home defeat. He scored his first league goal on 27 January, 2023 away at NAC Breda.

International career
Van Aken was called up to the Netherlands U19 squad in October 2021.

References

External links
 

Living people
2003 births
Dutch footballers
Eerste Divisie players
Jong AZ players